Angelo Marchetti (1674 – 1753) was an Italian mathematician and cosmographer from Pistoia.

He was Alessandro Marchetti's son and a member of the Academy of Arcadia in Rome.

Works

References 

1674 births
1753 deaths
17th-century Italian astronomers
17th-century Italian mathematicians
18th-century Italian astronomers
18th-century Italian mathematicians
Members of the Academy of Arcadians
People from Pistoia